Andrew Horrell (born 18 July 1988) is a New Zealand rugby union player who represents the Coca-Cola Red Sparks.

In 2013, he signed a contract extension with the Chiefs until 2015.

2011 ITM Cup
Horrell came to prominence in the 2011 ITM Cup where he was the competitions highest scorer with 152 points.

External links
 Chiefs profile
 Hawke's Bay Player Profile
 itsrugby.co.uk profile

References

1988 births
Living people
New Zealand rugby union players
Rugby union fly-halves
Rugby union centres
Chiefs (rugby union) players
Hawke's Bay rugby union players
Rugby union players from Christchurch
Coca-Cola Red Sparks players
New Zealand expatriate rugby union players
Expatriate rugby union players in Japan
New Zealand expatriate sportspeople in Japan